Me and Will is a 1999 road drama film written, starring and directed by Melissa Behr and Sherrie Rose. Additional casting includes Patrick Dempsey, Seymour Cassel, Grace Zabriskie, M. Emmet Walsh, Billy Wirth, Johnny Whitworth, John Enos III, and Julie McCullough.

It was produced by Melissa Behr, Sherrie Rose, Pierre David, Joey Forsyte, Jason Hall, Gary Kohn, and Vesco Razpopov. The film's score was composed by Wild Colonials guitarist, Shark with Additional Music by Matt Sorum & Thomas Morse.

The movie's tagline is Nobody rides for free. In the film, two women (Rose and Behr) meet while going to rehab. They discover that they've both longed to ride Captain America's red, white, and blue motorcycle from Easy Rider (1969) and they escape the rehab clinic and go on the highway in search of their dream bike.

Plot

Jane and Will are familiar faces in the Los Angeles club scene who meet at a drug rehab after Will smashes her motorcycle while stoned and Jane has overdosed. They connect easily, and after one of them claims to know where they can find the red, white, and blue bike from Easy Rider they hatch a plan to escape the clinic and take the long ride to Montana on their own bikes in search of the legend.

Cast

 
 Sherrie Rose as Jane
 Melissa Behr as Will
 Patrick Dempsey as Fast Eddie
 Seymour Cassell as Roy
 Grace Zabriskie as Edith
 M. Emmet Walsh as Dean
 Billy Wirth as Charlie
 Johnny Whitworth as Fred
 John Enos III as Jack
 Julie McCullough as Stacey
 Michael Bowen as George
 Steve Railsback as Rob
 Bojesse Christopher as Joseph
 Chuck Zito as a Biker

Filming Location

The film was shot in Los Angeles, California.

References

External links
 
 

American road movies
1990s road movies
1990s English-language films
1990s American films